Rodger "Roj" Vincent Freeth, Ph.D., (24 December 1953 – 18 September 1993) was a New Zealand motor sport competitor.

Career 
He held a Ph.D. in Physics and had a distinguished academic and motorsport career. His first love was motorcycles and whilst he was still at university he built a radical Yamaha TZ750A with an aerofoil. As a result, the controlling body (New Zealand Auto-Cycle Union) banned the use of aerodynamic aids in motorcycle racing. He won the Arai 500 endurance race at Mount Panorama Circuit, Bathurst, Australia in 1982 and 1985, as well as NZ titles on NZ-built McIntosh Suzukis.

Awards and recognition 
He later became one of New Zealand's best known rally co-drivers, first with Neil Allport and then with Peter "Possum" Bourne. As a driver he also won TraNZam titles in his V8 Starlet.

Freeth died in 1993 as a result of injuries received in an accident on the first day of the World Championship event Rally Australia co-driving for Possum Bourne.

World Rally Championship results

Other International Rally results

References 

New Zealand motorsport people
World Rally Championship co-drivers
New Zealand rally co-drivers
1953 births
1993 deaths
Sport deaths in Australia
Accidental deaths in Western Australia